Magnus Olsson (4 January 1949 in Bromma, Stockholm – 20 April 2013 in Spain) was a Swedish competitive sailor.

He took part in six Whitbread/Volvo Ocean races between 1985 and 2009. He won the 1997–98 race with the EF Language.

Magnus Olsson was a coach of Volvo Ocean Race Team SCA until April 2013, when he suffered a stroke and died at a hospital in Lanzarote.

Achievements

References

External links
 

1949 births
2013 deaths
Swedish male sailors (sport)
Volvo Ocean Race sailors